Soslan Ruslanovich Kagermazov (born 20 August 1996) is a Russian football player. He plays for FC Dynamo Makhachkala.

Club career
He made his debut in the Russian Professional Football League for FC Sochi on 29 July 2016 in a game against FC Krasnodar-2.

He made his Russian Football National League debut for FC Shinnik Yaroslavl on 26 July 2017 in a game against FC Kuban Krasnodar.

References

External links
 
 Profile by Russian Professional Football League

1996 births
People from Karachayevsky District
Sportspeople from Karachay-Cherkessia
Living people
Russian footballers
Association football midfielders
FC Shinnik Yaroslavl players
FC Fakel Voronezh players
FC Kuban Krasnodar players
FC Noah players
FC Dynamo Makhachkala players
Russian First League players
Russian Second League players
Armenian Premier League players
Russian expatriate footballers
Expatriate footballers in Armenia
Russian expatriate sportspeople in Armenia
Expatriate footballers in Latvia
Russian expatriate sportspeople in Latvia